David Readman (born 6 July 1970) is an English singer best known as the vocalist of hard rock band Pink Cream 69 and former vocalist of progressive metal band Adagio. He released a solo album in 2007 and was part of German guitarist Alex Beyrodt's band Voodoo Circle, from 2008 to 2016, returning in 2020.

In 2015, two new projects featuring Readman on lead vocals were announced. The first called Room Experience, is a melodic rock project led by Italian musician Gianluca Firmo, with a self-titled album released in May 2015. And the second is Almanac, the new heavy metal band led by former Rage guitarist Victor Smolski. In September 2016 it was announced he had reformed the David Readman Band, his solo band that he founded in Germany. It now features Dutch musicians Emile Marcelis (ex-Vengeance, bass), Eddie Claessens (Vandale, drums) and Bram Engelen (Ostrogoth, guitars).

Readman joined British heavy metal band Tank in 2017. In October of the same year, a new project called Pendulum of Fortune came out, featuring Readman with Bodo Schopf, Franky R. and led by Vladimir Shevjakov.

In 2020, while the world was being plunged into a lockdown along with Julien Spreutels, Francesco Mattei, Nicolas Spreutels and Dennis Thomas, founded Immunity for the Masses, and released their first track ‘Welcome To This Nightmare’ a project that defied all laws of music by being written and fully produced remotely from all corners of Europe all within two weeks.

Early life 
Readman was born in Burnley, Lancashire, and attended Towneley High School.

Discography

Solo 
David Readman (2007)
Medusa (2022)

Pink Cream 69 
Change (1995)
Food for Thought (1997)
Electrified (1998)
Live (1999)
Sonic Dynamite (2000)
Mixery (2000)
Endangered (2001)
Thunderdome (2004)
In10sity (2007)
Ceremonial (2013)
Headstrong (2017)

Adagio 
Sanctus Ignis (2001)
Underworld (2003)
A Band in Upperworld (2004)

Andersen/Laine/Readman 
III (Three) (2006)

Voodoo Circle 
 Voodoo Circle (2008)
 Broken Heart Syndrome (2011)
 More Than One Way Home (2013)
 Whisky Fingers (2015)
 Locked & Loaded (2021)

Room Experience 
 Room Experience (2015)

Almanac 
 Tsar (2016)
 Kingslayer (2017)

Pendulum of Fortune 
 Searching for the God Inside (2017)
 Return To Eden (2019)

Tank 
Re-Ignition (2019)

Immunity for the Masses 
 Welcome to This Nightmare (2020)

As a guest

Misha Calvin 
Evolution II (1995) (under the name Dave Twose)

D. C. Cooper 
D. C. Cooper (1999) (backing vocals)

Silent Force 
The Empire of Future (2000)

Missa Mercuria 
Missa Mercuria (2002)

Delany 
Blaze and Ashes (2009)

Place Vendome 
Place Vendome (2005) (co-wrote "Heavens Door" and backing vocals)

Magnus Karlsson's Free Fall 
Free Fall (2013)
Kingdom of Rock (2015)

Thomas Zwijsen 
 Perferct Storm, Nylonized Album (2014)

Luca Turilli's Rhapsody 
Prometheus, Symphonia Ignis Divinus – lead vocals on "King Solomon and the 72 Names of God" (2015)

Thomas Blug – Blug Plays Hendrix (2010)
Thomas Blug – guitar
David Readman – vocals
Reggie Worthy – bass
Wolf Simon – drums
special guests – Dreist

References

External links 
Official David Readman website
Official Pink Cream 69 website
Official Voodoo Circle website
David Readman (Room Experience, Pink Cream 69, ex-Voodo Circle) – ,,I’m sure we are ready to hit the stage…“

1970 births
Living people
People from Burnley
English male singers
English heavy metal singers
Pink Cream 69 members
Tank (band) members
Adagio (band) members
21st-century English singers
21st-century British male singers
Frontiers Records artists
AFM Records artists